Prasophyllum pallens, commonly known as the musty leek orchid, is a species of orchid in the family Orchidaceae which is endemic to Australia. It was one of eleven species selected for the Save a Species Walk campaign in April 2016; scientists walked 300 km to raise money for collection of seeds to be prepared and stored at the Australian PlantBank at the Australian Botanic Garden, Mount Annan.

References

External links 
 

pallens
Endemic orchids of Australia
Plants described in 1810